= Florentine Angele Soki Fuani Eyenga =

Congolese politician

Florentine Angele Soki Fuani Eyenga is a Congolese politician. From 1985 to 1987, Soki Fuani Eyenga was the Minister of Social and Women's Affairs for Zaire. She was the minister of Health and Family in 1995.
